Sultan Bantilan Airport , formerly known as Lalos Airport, is an airport near Toli-Toli, a city in the province of Central Sulawesi on the island of Sulawesi in Indonesia.

Facilities

Toli-Toli can be accessed by public transportation such as the Toli-toli transport and buses operated  Shantika, Perum DAMRI and Harapan Jaya. Traveling by car or motorcycle is also an option.

Airlines and destinations

References

Airports in Central Sulawesi